Amaloxestis is a genus of moths in the lecithocerid subfamily Lecithocerinae. It was established by László Anthony Gozmány in 1971.

Species
 Amaloxestis astringens Gozmány, 1973
 Amaloxestis callitricha (Meyrick, 1910)
 Amaloxestis chiloptila (Meyrick, 1921)
 Amaloxestis nepalensis Gozmány, 1973
 Amaloxestis perizeucta (Meyrick, 1910)

References

Natural History Museum Lepidoptera genus database

 
Lecithocerinae
Moth genera